= Valambal =

Valambal also known as Maniammal as an Indian social activist who fought against capitalism in Thanjavur district.

Valambal was born in a Brahmin family of Thanjavur district. Married at a very young age, Valambal lost her husband when young. Valambal, however, defied tradition by refusing to wear a white saree or to tonsure her head.

Valambal cut her hair short and dressed like a young man. She, then, led a peasant insurrection against oppressive landlords of the Cauvery Delta. She was also partly responsible for the impressive performance of the Communist Party of India in the Thanjavur region.
